Robert Rintje Ritsma (born 13 April 1970) is a Dutch former long track speed skater. His nickname is the Beer van Lemmer, which translates to the Bear from Lemmer, analogous to Igor Zhelezovski's nickname "The Bear from Minsk", both of which are in reference to their imposing physical appearance.

He appeared in the Dutch version of The Masked Singer as the Springbok.

In October 2022 Ritsma started as the Dutch national speed skating coach of the team pursuit, team sprint, and the mass start.

Speed skating career
He has won the World Allround Championships 4 times. He won this title in 1995, 1996,1999 and 2001; he was second in 1998 and 2003; he was third in 1993, 1994 and 2000.

He has won the European Allround Championships a record 6 times: 1994-1996 and 1998-2000.

He participated in five Winter Olympics, winning two silver and four bronze medals, from the 1994, 1998 and 2006 Games.

He also stood at the top of the alltime world ranking, the Adelskalender, for a long time (1,125 days in total).

Records

World records
Over the course of his career, Ritsma skated 4 world records:

Source: SpeedSkatingStats.com

Personal records

Source: SpeedskatingResults.com

Tournament overview

source:

World Cup overview

On 1 December 2013 in Astana, Kazakhstan, Sven Kramer won his 30th ISU World Cup event thus surpassing Ritsma as the most successful Dutch World Cup speed skater.

Source:
– = Did not participate
* = 10000 meter

Medals won

References

External links
Photos of Rintje Ritsma
Rintje Ritsma at SpeedSkatingStats.com

1970 births
Living people
Dutch male speed skaters
Speed skaters at the 1992 Winter Olympics
Speed skaters at the 1994 Winter Olympics
Speed skaters at the 1998 Winter Olympics
Speed skaters at the 2002 Winter Olympics
Speed skaters at the 2006 Winter Olympics
Olympic speed skaters of the Netherlands
Olympic silver medalists for the Netherlands
Olympic bronze medalists for the Netherlands
People from De Fryske Marren
Sportspeople from Friesland
Olympic medalists in speed skating
World record setters in speed skating
Medalists at the 2006 Winter Olympics
Medalists at the 1998 Winter Olympics
Medalists at the 1994 Winter Olympics
World Allround Speed Skating Championships medalists
World Single Distances Speed Skating Championships medalists